The 2001–02 Euro Hockey Tour was the sixth season of the Euro Hockey Tour. The season consisted of four tournaments, the Česká Pojišťovna Cup, Sweden Hockey Games, Baltica Brewery Cup, and the Karjala Tournament.

Tournaments

Česká Pojišťovna Cup
Finland won the Česká Pojišťovna Cup.

Sweden Hockey Games
Sweden won the Sweden Hockey Games. Canada also participated in the tournament. The games they participated in did not count towards the final standings of the Euro Hockey Tour.

Baltica Brewery Cup
The Czech Republic won the Baltica Brewery Cup.

Karjala Tournament
Finland won the Karjala Tournament.

Final standings

References
Euro Hockey Tour website

Euro Hockey Tour
2001–02 in European ice hockey
2001–02 in Canadian ice hockey
2001–02 in Russian ice hockey
2001–02 in Czech ice hockey
2001–02 in Swedish ice hockey
2001–02 in Finnish ice hockey